V Antliae (V Ant) is a Mira variable star in the constellation Antlia.  It varies in brightness between magnitudes 8.2 and 14.0 with a period of 303 days.

References

Mira variables
Antlia
M-type giants
Antliae, V
050697
Emission-line stars
J10210911-3447188